The Bureau of Ordnance (BuOrd) was a United States Navy organization, which was responsible for the procurement, storage, and deployment of all naval weapons, between the years 1862 and 1959.

History
Congress established the Bureau in the Department of the Navy by an act of July 5, 1862 (12 Stat. 510), which transferred the hydrographic functions of the Navy's Bureau of Ordnance and Hydrography (1842–1862) to the newly established Bureau of Navigation.

During the early 20th century, BuOrd became involved in the development of aerial weapons.  This often led to friction with the Bureau of Aeronautics (BuAer), which had responsibility for the development of Naval aircraft.  BuAer's work on "pilotless aircraft," or drones, conflicted with BuOrd's development of guided missiles.  After World War II, the Navy examined ways to improve coordination between the two bureaus; ultimately, the decision was made to merge the two organizations into a new bureau, to be known as the Bureau of Naval Weapons (BuWeps). 

It was heavily criticized during the Second World War for its failure to quickly remedy the numerous issues with the Mark 14 torpedo which had an over 70% dud rate.

BuOrd was disestablished by Congress by an act of August 18, 1959, and its functions were transferred to the newly established Bureau of Naval Weapons.  BuAir merged with BuOrd to form BuWeps.  BuWeps, in turn, was disestablished in 1966 when the Navy overhauled its materiel organization, and was replaced with the Naval Ordnance Systems Command (NAVORD) and the Naval Air Systems Command (NAVAIR). Other systems commands at the time included the Naval Ship Systems Command (NAVSHIPS) and the Naval Electronics Systems Command (NAVELEX).  Ship and submarine ordnance functions fell under the new Naval Ordnance Systems Command while air ordnance stayed with the Naval Air Systems Command.  In July 1974, the Naval Ordnance Systems Command and Naval Ship Systems Command merged to form the Naval Sea Systems Command (NAVSEA).  Traditional Naval Ordnance functions are now conducted at the Naval Surface Warfare Centers which fall under the command of Naval Sea Systems Command.

Chiefs of the Bureau of Ordnance

 Rear Admiral John A. Dahlgren, 1862–1863
 Captain Henry Augustus Wise, 1863–1868
 Rear Admiral John A. Dahlgren, 1868–1869
 Rear Admiral Augustus Case, 1869–1873
 Commodore William Nicholson Jeffers, 1873–1881
 Commodore Montgomery Sicard, 1881–1890
 Captain William M. Folger, 1890–1893
 Commodore William T. Sampson, 1893–1897
 Rear Admiral Charles O'Neil, 1897–1904
 Rear Admiral George A. Converse, 1904
 Rear Admiral Newton E. Mason, 1904–1911
 Rear Admiral Nathan C. Twining, 1911–1913
 Rear Admiral Joseph Strauss, 1913–1916
 Rear Admiral Ralph Earle, 1916–1920
 Rear Admiral Charles B. McVay Jr., 1920–1923
 Rear Admiral Claude C. Bloch, 1923–1927
 Rear Admiral William D. Leahy, 1927–1931
 Rear Admiral Edgar B. Larimer, 1931–1934
 Rear Admiral Harold Rainsford Stark, 1934–1937
 Rear Admiral William R. Furlong, 1937–1941
 Rear Admiral William H. P. Blandy, 1941–1943
 Vice Admiral George F. Hussey Jr., 1943–1947
 Rear Admiral Albert G. Noble, 1947–1950
 Rear Admiral Malcom F. Schoeffel, 1950–1954
 Rear Admiral Fredric S. Withington, 1954–1958

Footnotes

Further reading

External links 
 
 

1862 establishments in the United States
1959 disestablishments in the United States
Ordnance
Naval weapons of the United States